Xanadu in Africa is an album by saxophonists Al Cohn and Billy Mitchell, pianist Dolo Coker, bassist Leroy Vinnegar and drummer Frank Butler recorded in Dakar in 1980 for Xanadu Records.

Reception 

The Allmusic review by Scott Yanow stated "Despite the exotic location, this LP contains a typical Xanadu high-quality bebop date. The quintet performs five standards in Senegal (this may very well be the first live recording of American jazz musicians in Africa) and the crowd is rightfully enthusiastic. Even if the music contains few surprises, this album is easily recommended to bop collectors".

Track listing 
 "All or Nothing at All" (Arthur Altman, Jack Lawrence) – 12:22
 "Robbins Nest" (Illinois Jacquet, Sir Charles Thompson) – 10:40
 "I Surrender Dear" (Harry Barris, Gordon Clifford) – 8:50
 "Blues in the Closet" (Oscar Pettiford) – 4:52
 "Easy Living" (Ralph Rainger, Leo Robin) – 9:25

Personnel 
Al Cohn, Billy Mitchell – tenor saxophone
Dolo Coker – piano
Leroy Vinnegar – bass
Frank Butler – drums

References 

1981 live albums
Xanadu Records live albums
Billy Mitchell (jazz musician) live albums
Al Cohn live albums
Dolo Coker live albums
Albums produced by Don Schlitten